The Kevin Sheedy Medal is the award given to the Greater Western Sydney Giants player determined to have been the "best and fairest" throughout an AFL season. The voting system as of the 2017 AFL season, consists of up to five coaches giving each player a ranking out of four after each match. The award is named after the club's inaugural coach, Kevin Sheedy.

The inaugural winner of the award was one of the club's inaugural captains, Callan Ward.

Recipients

Multiple winners

References

External links

Australian Football League awards
Greater Western Sydney Giants
Awards established in 2012
Australian rules football-related lists